Harold Chalton Bradshaw CBE M.Arch FRIBA (15 February 1893 – 15 October 1943) was a Liverpool-born architect, recipient of the first Rome scholarship in Architecture (1913) & first Secretary of The Royal Fine Art Commission.

His design work included the British School at Rome's Common Room (1924, as projected by Edwin Lutyens) and several Commonwealth War Graves Commission First World War cemeteries and memorials, including the Cambrai Memorial in France and the Ploegsteert Memorial to the Missing and its surrounding cemetery. He also designed the Guards' Division Memorial in St. James's Park in London.

He received an honorary Degree of Master in Architecture from the University of Liverpool in 1930, and lectured at The Architectural Association.

Bradshaw married Mary Taylor, an archaeologist, in 1918. They had three children: Christopher, a graphic designer; Julian, a physicist; and Anthony, a professor of botany.

References

1893 births
1943 deaths
Architects from Liverpool
Fellows of the Royal Institute of British Architects